New France (aka French North America) was a colonial possession of France in North America.

New France may also refer to:

Historical
 Canada (New France), a former colony of France; the portion of New France frequently regarded as "New France"
 Kingdom of Araucanía and Patagonia, South America; also called "New France"
 Company of New France, a French colonial syndicate with a monopoly on the fur trade in New France

Current locations
New France, Antigonish, Nova Scotia, Canada; a village
New France, Digby, Nova Scotia, Canada; a village
 New Ireland (island), South Pacific, Oceania; formerly named "New France"

Other uses
 Tour of New France, a former pro-cycling race in Canada

See also

 
 France (disambiguation)
 New (disambiguation)
 Nouvelle France (disambiguation)